Into the Vortex is the second album by Hammerhead. It was released in 1994 through Amphetamine Reptile Records.

Critical reception
Portland Mercury called the album "one of the finest releases in the storied history of Amphetamine Reptile Records." The Seattle Times wrote that "the songs ... explode like pop supernovas - the music is packed so densely that it bursts into massive fireballs of rage." Gimme Indie Rock: 500 Essential American Underground Rock Albums 1981-1996 called Into the Vortex "among the most intense and enjoyable albums to come out of indie rock's less friendly back streets."

Track listing

Personnel 
Hammerhead
Paul Erickson – bass guitar, vocals
Jeff Mooridian Jr. – drums
Paul Sanders – guitar, vocals
Production and additional personnel
Tom Hazelmyer – cover art
Tim Mac – recording

References

External links 
 

1994 albums
Amphetamine Reptile Records albums
Hammerhead (band) albums